SS Lulworth Hill was a British cargo ship completed by William Hamilton & Co in Port Glasgow on the Firth of Clyde in 1940. Lulworth Hill had a single 520 NHP triple-expansion steam engine driving a single screw.

She was owned by Dorset Steamships Co Ltd and managed by Counties Ship Management Co Ltd of London (CSM), both of which were offshoots of the Rethymnis & Kulukundis shipbroking company.

Sinking
The Italian navy submarine  torpedoed the Lulworth Hill in the South Atlantic on 19 March 1943. 14 survivors made it onto a life raft. One source, seemingly quoting one of only three men to survive the sinking and subsequent ordeal on the life raft, states that the Germans surfaced and machine gunned the survivors; however, this is unlikely as the submarine was not German and the only other survivor of the life raft, in his book of the events, made no such accusation. The Leonardo da Vinci captured and took on board one survivor of the sinking, James Leslie Hull. After 29 days the UK authorities assumed that the Lulworth Hill had been lost with all hands and duly informed their families.

On 7 May the Royal Navy R-class destroyer  picked up one of the Lulworth Hill'''s liferafts. Of the 14 men that had survived the sinking, after 50 days adrift only two, Seaman Shipwright (i.e. carpenter) Kenneth Cooke and Able Seaman Colin Armitage, remained alive. On 7 December 1943 both men were awarded the George Medal and on 7 November 1944 the Lloyd's War Medal for Bravery at Sea. In 1985 a radio interview was broadcast in which Cooke described their ordeal and survival.

There were no survivors. James Hull, the prisoner from Lulworth Hill, had previously been transferred to the Italian submarine Finzi.

Replacement ship
In 1947 Dorset Steamships bought the Empire ship SS Empire Mandarin and renamed her Lulworth Hill. In 1949 she was renamed Castle Hill. In 1950 she was transferred to a new Rethymnis & Kulukundis company, London & Overseas Freighters Ltd, who renamed her London Builder. LOF sold her in 1951 to new owners who registered her under the Panamanian flag of convenience as Silver Wake. She changed owners and names several more times, becoming Navarino in 1954, Stanhope in 1955 and Ardbrae'' in 1961. She was scrapped at Onomichi, Japan in 1966.

References

Sources & further reading

Ships built on the River Clyde
Steamships of the United Kingdom
1940 ships
Ships of Counties Ship Management
Maritime incidents in March 1943
Ships sunk by Italian submarines
World War II shipwrecks in the Atlantic Ocean
World War II merchant ships of the United Kingdom